Game of the Year (GotY) is an award given to a video game by various award events and media publications that they feel represented the pinnacle of gaming that year.

Events and ceremonies

British Academy Games Awards (BAFTA Games Awards) 

The British Academy Games Awards are an annual British awards ceremony honoring "outstanding creative achievement" in the video game industry. First presented in 2004 following the restructuring of the BAFTA Interactive Entertainment Awards, the awards are presented by the British Academy of Film and Television Arts (BAFTA), and are thus commonly referred to as the BAFTA Games Awards.

Czech Game of the Year Awards 
The Czech Game of the Year Awards are annual awards that recognize accomplishments in video game development.

D.I.C.E. Awards 

The D.I.C.E. Awards are awarded by the Academy of Interactive Arts & Sciences (AIAS), a non-profit organization of industry professionals. The awards were previously known as the Interactive Achievement Awards until 2013.

Electronic Gaming Awards (formerly Arcade Awards) 
The Arcade Awards, also known as the Arkie Awards, was one of the first video game awards, dating back to the golden age of arcade video games and lasting up until the video game crash of 1983. It was held since 1980 (for games released in 1979 and earlier) and were announced annually by Electronic Games magazine since 1981, covering several platform categories. Following the magazine's revival in 1992, it published the Electronic Gaming Awards in January 1993 for the best video games released in 1992. The 1992 and 1993 award were voted on by readers.

Famitsu Awards 
The Grand Prize winners of the annual Famitsu Awards, voted by Famitsu magazine's readers. An annual award ceremony has been held since 2005. Prior to 2005, the results were published in the magazine's annual "Best Hit Game Awards" feature since early 1987 (for games released in 1986).

The Game Awards 

Geoff Keighley, producer and host of the Spike Video Game Awards, created The Game Awards in 2014. The winners are determined by a blended vote between the voting jury (90%) and public fan voting (10%); the jury panel consists of members from 96 global media outlets.

Game Developers Choice Awards 

The Game Developers Choice Award for Game of the Year is announced during the Game Developers Choice Awards at the Game Developers Conference (GDC), the largest annual gathering of professional video game developers.

Golden Joystick Awards 

The Golden Joystick Awards is the second oldest gaming award ceremony and is the longest-running video game award. The inaugural ceremony took place in 1984 in London's Berkeley Square.

Japan Game Awards (formerly CESA Awards) 
The winners of the Grand Award annually given by the Japan Game Awards, formerly known as the CESA Awards, since 1996. There are some years where two games shared the Grand Award.

New York Game Awards 
The New York Videogame Critics Circle hosts an annual award show that recognizes the best contributions to the video game industry from the previous year.

Spike Video Game Awards 
The winners of the Spike Video Game Awards, hosted by Spike between 2003 and 2013, awarded the Game of the Year using an advisory council featuring over 20 journalists from media outlets. The show's title was changed to VGX in 2013 before Spike TV dropped the show entirely. Host and producer Geoff Keighley created The Game Awards in 2014.

SXSW Gaming Awards 
The winners of the SXSW Gaming Awards are judged by the SXSW Gaming Advisory Board, which is composed of over 40 industry members.

VSDA Awards 
The Video Software Dealers Association's VSDA Awards for home entertainment handed out awards for the best video games of the year until 2001.

Publications and media

Ars Technica

Destructoid

Easy Allies (formerly GameTrailers)

Edge

Electronic Gaming Monthly (EGM)

Empire

Entertainment Weekly

Eurogamer

Game Informer 
During their earlier years of publication they would give awards for the best game on each console available at the time, occasionally giving an award to the overall best game of the year. In 2017, they retroactively awarded a GOTY award for each past year that did not have an overall best game.

GameSpot

GamesRadar+

Gamest

Giant Bomb

Hardcore Gamer

IGN

Polygon

Time

USgamer

Yahoo!

See also 

 List of video games considered the best
 List of video game awards

References 

Video game awards
Video game culture
Video game lists by reception or rating
Game of the Year awards